Boomers is a British television sitcom that was first broadcast on BBC One on 15 August 2014. The show was originally titled Grey Mates but was changed to Boomers in June 2014. Spanning two series and a special, it follows the ups and downs of three late middle-aged recently retired (or due to retire) couples who live in Thurnemouth, 'Norfolk's only west-facing resort'. The series was written by Richard Pinto, directed by Adam Miller and made by Hat Trick Productions. Paul Schlesinger is the producer and Jimmy Mulville is the executive producer for Hat Trick Productions.

Cast
Russ Abbot as John
Stephanie Beacham as Maureen
Philip Jackson as Alan
James Smith as Trevor
Alison Steadman as Joyce
June Whitfield as Joan
Paula Wilcox as Carol

Production
In September 2013, it was announced that Hat Trick Productions was recording a pilot of Boomers, then titled Grey Mates. The non-broadcast pilot was filmed in Hunstanton in northwest Norfolk and Herne Bay as well as the studio in September 2013.

Boomers, which was announced by Charlotte Moore, went into production in spring 2014. Filming began in May 2014.

The exteriors for the series were filmed in Herne Bay in Kent.

The theme tune is Tears of a Clown which accompanies the opening titles.

Filming for subsequent episodes took place in September 2015. A special was broadcast on BBC One on 23 December 2015, followed by a six-part second series beginning on 25 March 2016.

Episodes

Series 1 (2014)
The first series consists of six episodes and began airing on BBC One on 15 August 2014.

Christmas Special (2015)
The Christmas Special aired on BBC One on 23 December 2015. (Source: British Comedy Guide)

Series 2 (2016)
The second series consists of six episodes and began airing on BBC One on 25 March 2016. (Source: British Comedy Guide)

† - Marks the overnight ratings, used because the show is out of the Top 30 on BARB's listings for those weeks.

DVD release
The complete first series of Boomers was released on DVD on 22 September 2014.

References

External links
 
 
 

2014 British television series debuts
2016 British television series endings
2010s British sitcoms
BBC high definition shows
BBC television sitcoms
English-language television shows
Television series about couples
Television series by Hat Trick Productions
Television shows set in Norfolk